

Coonamia railway station was a "provisional stopping place" for passenger trains in the rural locality of the same name, 5.0 km (3.1 mi) by rail south-east of the centre of the city of Port Pirie, South Australia. It was operational for two separate periods: 
on the narrow-gauge route to Gladstone, from 1929 until an unknown date before 1970, when it closed
 on the same route (by then standard-gauge), from 1989 to the early 2010s, when it was the final locality in a series of six successive stations for passengers to board and alight trains at Port Pirie.

The stopping place was on Railway Terrace South, near its intersection with Old Race Course Road (now called Hillview Road). The South Australian Railways included it in timetables from about 1929 on the narrow-gauge railway line leading into the hinterland from Port Pirie. It was instituted for local passengers to board and alight trains without having to walk to the station at Port Pirie South.

Infrastructure was meagre: only a waiting shed and sign. There was no platform, as for all stations in the Mid North of South Australia at the time. Trains did not stop there unless a passenger signalled the driver to stop or notified the guard to be let off – indicated by an asterisk on timetables and its classification as a "provisional stopping place".

In 1937 a new, more direct, broad-gauge line from Adelaide followed a different route that bypassed Coonamia. The number of passengers using the stopping place declined further and it was eventually closed.

In 1989, the last major Port Pirie station (Mary Elie Street) closed. It was necessary to provide a facility for Port Pirie passengers — not for services to Adelaide, since all South Australian intrastate country passenger services were discontinued that year — but for interstate trains that passed through. The trains involved were The Ghan, Indian Pacific and (until June 1991) the Trans-Australian. As shown on the map, having a stop at Coonamia would allow trains to pick up and drop off Port Pirie passengers without having to reverse 3.8 km (2.4 mi) from the stub terminal to the mainline. A small ATCO demountable building, a public telephone booth and a car park were therefore put in place in 1989. The distance between the ground and the lowest step on passenger cars, however, caused difficulty for passengers who were not able-bodied.

Under the new arrangements, passengers had to pre-book to board or alight at Coonamia. Although the stopping place was also utilised by Crystal Brook passengers, since trains no longer stopped at that town, in the early 2010s the two remaining interstate trains no longer stopped and the infrastructure was removed. Only the Coonamia sign and  car park remained at the locality as of 2019.

Final significance 
Coonamia was never more significant than any other provisional stopping place, but its status in its final years was historic: it was the last of the six "stations" that had served Port Pirie and the last provisional stopping place in South Australia outside the Adelaide metropolitan area. The first Port Pirie station had opened 1876 when the only alternative transport was horse-drawn over unmade roads; Coonamia closed in the era of near-universal availability of motor vehicles.

Operationally, Coonamia is the place where ARTC train controllers in Adelaide (who oversee operations between Broken Hill and Coonamia, and Coonamia southwards) hand over to controllers in Port Augusta (who oversee the line to Port Augusta and points west); the sign remains so that train crews can identify the change-over point, which is also the "0 km" datum point for routes to Port Augusta, Broken Hill and Adelaide. The location has a crossing loop 1638 m (1791 yds) long on the south side of the double mainline from Crystal Brook.

Previous station: Mary Elie Street

Subsequent station: none (passenger services ceased). Bulk freight, in unit trains, continued at the simplified Port Pirie Junction railway station site.

See also
South Australian Railways
Transport in South Australia

Notes

References

Railway stations in South Australia
Disused railway stations in South Australia
Port Pirie